Kelmscott Senior High School  is a public co-educational high day school, located on Camillo Road in Kelmscott, a suburb of Perth, Western Australia.

Overview 
The school was established in 1973 and caters for students in Year 7 to Year 12.

The school enrolled 1,560 students in 2007, then 1,562 in 2008, to 1,573 in 2009, then fell to 1,379 in 2010 and to 1,439 in 2011. The fall in student numbers from 2010 is a result of the enrolment age changing for students entering high school in Western Australia.

The school won the Kim Hughes shield for the secondary school champion cricket team in Western Australia in 1987. The girls cricket team also won the Super 8 competition in 2002, 2003 and from 2005 to 2008.

Notable alumni
Brendon Ah CheeAustralian rules footballer
Trent Sainsburyassociation footballer
Riley Woodcockassociation footballer
Courtney BruceAustralian Diamond netballer
Rita Saffiotipolitician
Callum Ah CheeAustralian rules footballer
Kiara Bowers-AFLW footballer

See also

List of schools in the Perth metropolitan area

References

External links
 Official Website

Educational institutions established in 1973
Public high schools in Perth, Western Australia
1973 establishments in Australia